This is a list of Estonian television related events from 2012.

Events
3 March - Eesti otsib superstaari season 3 winner Ott Lepland is selected to represent Estonia at the 2012 Eurovision Song Contest with his song "Kuula". He is selected to be the eighteenth Estonian Eurovision entry during Eesti Laul held at the Nokia Concert Hall in Tallinn.
23 December - Rasmus Rändvee wins the fifth season of Eesti otsib superstaari.

Debuts

Television shows

1990s
Õnne 13 (1993–present)

2000s
Eesti otsib superstaari (2007–present)

Ending this year

Births

Deaths

See also
2012 in Estonia